John Gilbert Baker  (13 January 1834 – 16 August 1920) was an English botanist. His son was the botanist Edmund Gilbert Baker (1864–1949).

Biography
Baker was born in Guisborough in North Yorkshire, the son of John and Mary (née Gilbert) Baker, and died in Kew.

He was educated at Quaker schools at Ackworth School and Bootham School, York.

He then worked at the library and herbarium of the Royal Botanic Gardens, Kew between 1866 and 1899, and was keeper of the herbarium from 1890 to 1899. He wrote handbooks on many plant groups, including Amaryllidaceae, Bromeliaceae, Iridaceae, Liliaceae, and ferns. His published works include Flora of Mauritius and the Seychelles (1877) and Handbook of the Irideae (1892).

He married Hannah Unthank in 1860. Their son Edmund was one of twins, and his twin brother died before 1887.

John G. Baker was elected a Fellow of the Royal Society in 1878. He was awarded the Veitch Memorial Medal of the Royal Horticultural Society in 1907.

Taxa named in honour
Several plant species with the epithet bakeriana or bakeranius and bakeranium  have been named in honour of John G. Baker.

Including;
 Hieracium bakerianum
 Hymenostegia bakeriana
 Iris reticulata var. bakeriana (also known as Iris bakeriana)
 Lilium bakerianum 
 Rhodolaena bakeriana
 Rubus bakerianus

Selected publications

References

External links
 
 Handbook of the Irideae by J G Baker  (1892)

1834 births
1920 deaths
People from Guisborough
People educated at Ackworth School
People educated at Bootham School
English botanists
Fellows of the Royal Society
Fellows of the Linnean Society of London
Victoria Medal of Honour recipients
Veitch Memorial Medal recipients
British pteridologists